Anders Olsson (born September 15, 1965, in Hagfors) is a Swedish swimmer and triathlete.

Olsson is paralysed from the waist down and has barely 50% lung capacity left after the injury.

Career
Olsson began to swim at an early age and he was very promising. But in his early teens he started to have problems with his back, he had been in a weightlifting accident as a child. It was a faulty vertebra that caused him pain. For a long time he was able to keep up with his athletic life but after several years he had to undergo an arthrodesis operation. Due to an accident in the home he fell so badly that he tore several muscles in his back. This led to other complications. He had to undergo stomach surgery and because of a failure during the spinal anaesthesia he had to be treated in a medical ventilator and this finally led to him being paralysed from the waist down.

For several years Olsson was apathetic and got addicted to drugs, such as morphine, and other painkillers. But, in 2002, when a close friend made a bet with him that he would swim the vansbrosimmet an annual 3 km event in a river, his life took a turn for the better. He started to train and when he crossed the finish line he was in the top 100s out of over 3000 competitors. This is a result he later improved as he in 2007 came 9th.

In 2004 he competed in the Paralympics in Athens where he won one gold medal and two bronze medals. His favorite event is the 400 m freestyle, a distance he was undefeated at and where he is the current world record holder.

In 2005 he managed to complete the 90 km long Vasaloppet a crosscountry skiing competition, using a sled.

In 2008 he competed in the Paralympics in Beijing where he won another two gold medals (100 m & 400 m freestyle).

He won the annual swim competition at Alcatraz 2011, where he swam from the island to shore.

In the 2012 Paralympics he won silver in the 400m freestyle, the first time he had been beaten in this event in a major international competition.

References

External links

1965 births
Living people
Paralympic gold medalists for Sweden
Paralympic bronze medalists for Sweden
Paralympic swimmers of Sweden
Swimmers at the 2004 Summer Paralympics
Swimmers at the 2008 Summer Paralympics
Swimmers at the 2012 Summer Paralympics
World record holders in paralympic swimming
Medalists at the 2004 Summer Paralympics
Medalists at the 2008 Summer Paralympics
Medalists at the 2012 Summer Paralympics
S6-classified Paralympic swimmers
Paralympic silver medalists for Sweden
Swedish male freestyle swimmers
Medalists at the World Para Swimming European Championships
Paralympic medalists in swimming